"Better Man, Better Off" is a song written by Stan Paul Davis and Brett Jones, and recorded by American country music artist Tracy Lawrence.   It was released in February 1997 as the first single from his album The Coast Is Clear.  The song was Lawrence's eighteenth chart single and it peaked at number 2 on the U.S. Billboard Hot Country Singles & Tracks charts in 1997 and reached number 3 on the Canadian RPM Country Tracks chart. It also peaked at number 8 on the U.S. Billboard Bubbling Under Hot 100 chart, making it a minor crossover hit.

Content
"Better Man, Better Off" is a mid-tempo in the key of D major. In it, the narrator admits his mistakes in a failed relationship, but says that he will be a "better man, better off" for having learned from his mistakes.

Critical reception
Deborah Evans Price, of Billboard magazine reviewed the song favorably, calling it lyrically similar to Clint Black's "A Better Man". She goes on to say that the production "gives the tune a radio-ready feel, and Lawrence sings with a  that adds to the strength of the song."

Music video
The music video was directed by Michael Merriman and premiered in early 1997. Tracy Lawrence shaved his mustache off and cuts his mullet off with this video.

Chart positions
"Better Man, Better Off" debuted at number 55 on the U.S. Billboard Hot Country Singles & Tracks for the week of February 22, 1997.

Year-end charts

References

1997 singles
Tracy Lawrence songs
Song recordings produced by Don Cook
Atlantic Records singles
1997 songs
Songs written by Brett Jones (songwriter)